Malick Diaw is a Malian soldier and politician.

Biography 
Colonel Malick Diaw was a student at the  then joined the Joint Military School in Koulikoro in 1998. He was also Subjete of the General Staff of the National Guard in the 3rd Military Region of Kati.

As an artillery officer, he participated in the Mali War between 2013 and 2017.

He was one of the soldiers present at the massive rally to celebrate the fall of President Ibrahim Boubacar Keïta and is considered one of the masterminds of the 2020 Malian coup d'état that overthrew the president. He became second in command of the Military Junta led by Assimi Goïta, interim vice president in the transition of Mali. He also played a key role in negotiations with the Economic Community of West African States to lift sanctions in October.

References 

1979 births
Vice presidents of Mali
Malian military personnel
People from Ségou
Living people
21st-century Malian people